Uczniowski Klub Sportowy  Szkoła Mistrzostwa Sportowego   Łódź, commonly known as UKS SMS Łódź, is a Polish football club based in Łódź, Łódź Voivodeship, currently playing in the regional league.

The club is well known for working with youngsters. UKS SMS Łódź operates at the Kazimierz Górski's High School of the Sports Championship School at the 12 Milionowa 12 Street in Łódź. The stadium has a capacity of 3,000 places (2,000 seats).

UKS SMS grown-ups

Ekstraklasa 
  Krzysztof Baran (Jagiellonia Białystok)
  Przemysław Macierzyński (Lechia Gdańsk)
  Tomasz Makowski (Lechia Gdańsk)
  Patryk Stępiński (Wisła Płock)
  Maciej Makuszewski (Lech Poznań)
  Jakub Bursztyn (Pogoń Szczecin)
  Artur Bogusz (ŁKS Łódź)
  Michał Kołba (ŁKS Łódź)
  Mateusz Cholewiak (Legia Warszawa)
  Andrzej Niewulis (Raków Częstochowa)
  Błażej Augustyn (Lechia Gdańsk)
  Tomasz Jodłowiec (Piast Gliwice)
  Patryk Stępiński (Wisła Płock)
  Przemysław Płacheta (Śląsk Wrocław)

I liga 
  Mariusz Rybicki (Warta Poznań)
  Aboubacan Conde (Miedź Legnica)
  Jakub Kiełb (Warta Poznań)
  Bartosz Biel (GKS Bełchatów)
  Artur Krysiak (Odra Opole)
  Mateusz Cetnarski (Stomil Olsztyn)
  Marcin Kowalczyk (GKS Tychy)
  Paweł Zawistowski (Chojniczanka Chojnice)

II liga 
  Robert Prochownik (Widzew Łódź)
  Marcel Pięczek (Widzew Łódź)
  Patryk Wolański (Widzew Łódź)
  Piotr Marciniec (Pogoń Siedlce)
  Jakub Romanowski (Pogoń Siedlce)
  Oktawian Obuchowski (Skra Częstochowa)
  Adrian Kostrzewski (Górnik Łęczna)
  Sebastian Zalepa (Resovia Rzeszów)
  Jakub Kowalski (Garbarnia Kraków)

Foreign leagues 
  Sebastian Zieleniecki (Kickers Offenbach)
  Maciej Mas (Cagliari Primavera)
  Karol Świderski (Charlotte FC)
  Krystian Nowak (Bohemians)

References

External links 
  
 UKS SMS Łódź at 90minut.pl 

Association football clubs established in 1999
1999 establishments in Poland
Football clubs in Łódź